Old Style can refer to:

Typography
 Old Style (Miller & Richard), a popular serif typeface 
 Goudy Old Style, a font
 Old style figures, numerals with ascenders and descenders
 A colloquial name for Antiqua typeface class
 A colloquial name for Classical typeface class

Other uses
Old Style and New Style dates, a shift from the Julian to the Gregorian calendar: 1752 in Britain, 1918 in Russia
Old Style Beer, a brand of beer brewed in Wisconsin and popular in Chicago

See also
 Old-fashioned (disambiguation)